HC Chelny is an ice hockey team in Naberezhnye Chelny, Russia. The team plays in the Supreme Hockey League Championship, the third level of Russian ice hockey. The club was founded in 1970.

References

External links
 Official site

Ice hockey teams in Russia
Ice hockey clubs established in 1970